Sourp Kevork (Saint George) is the Armenian Apostolic church in Limassol, Cyprus.

The church is located near the town centre of Limassol and was built in 1939 on land purchased and donated by Mrs Satenig Soultanian, in memory of her father, Hampartsoum Kevorkian. The first official liturgy took place in 1940 and the consecration took place in 1948 by Archbishop Ghevont Chebeyian.

Its bell was made electronic in 1989, according to an inscription on the church, and it was renovated in 2007 and again in 2015. It is located in the same grounds with the Limassol Nareg school, which is next to church and was re-built in 2006–2007. Liturgies are held there every other Sunday. In front of the church is a brown tuff stone khachkar, donated in 2008 by the Arakelyan family,.

The current pastor of the Sourp Kevork church is der Mashdots Ashkarian.

References

Armenian churches in Cyprus
Churches in Limassol